Willian Silva Costa Pacheco (born 28 March 1992) is a Brazilian professional footballer who plays as a centre-back.

Club career

Persija Jakarta
In 2016, Willian signed for Indonesian club, Persija Jakarta, and on 29 April 2016, Willian made his league debut for the club in a 1–1 draw against Persipura Jayapura at Mandala Stadium.

On 13 June 2017, Willian scored his first league goal for the club, the opening goal against Perseru Serui in a 3–0 win in the Liga 1. three days later, Willian scored the only goal in the 2nd minute, and it was the winner against Sriwijaya. He had a good season this season with 30 appearances and 5 goals, while helping Persija Jakarta to rank fourth in the league this season.

Selangor F.C.
On 4 December 2017, Willian move to Malaysia and signed a one-year contract with Malaysia Super League club Selangor. He made his league debut for Selangor when he was part of the starting lineup of a 2018 Malaysia Super League match against Kuala Lumpur City on 4 February 2018, in which Selangor won. During the 2018 season, Willian helped his team finish 8th in the league with 14 appearances and without goals. He left the club at March 2014. He left the club at the end of the year.

Bali United F.C.
On 14 January 2019, Willian was signed for Bali United to play in Liga 1 in the 2019 season. He made his league debut on 16 May 2019 in a match against Persebaya Surabaya at the Kapten I Wayan Dipta Stadium, Gianyar Regency. On 26 June 2019, Willian scored his first goal for Bali United, during a 2–2 league draw against Kalteng Putra. He scored his second league goal for the club four days later in a 0–3 away win against Badak Lampung. On 24 August, he scored the opening goal in a 2–1 win over Arema. He had a good season in this season with 24 appearances and 4 goals, while helping Bali United win the championship Liga 1 this season. On 2 December 2019, Bali United won the championship for the first time in their history, becoming the seventh club to win the Liga 1 after second placed Borneo draw to PSM, followed by a win in Semen Padang, giving Bali United a 17-point lead with only four games left.

Career statistics

Club

Honours

Club
Bali United
 Liga 1: 2019, 2021–22

Individual
 Liga 1 Best Eleven: 2017
 APPI Indonesian Football Award Best 11: 2021–22 '''

References

External links
 
 Willian Pacheco at Eurosport

1992 births
Living people
Sportspeople from São Paulo 
Persija Jakarta players
Association football defenders
Brazilian footballers
Brazil under-20 international footballers
Brazilian expatriate footballers
Expatriate footballers in Belgium
Expatriate footballers in Indonesia
Expatriate footballers in Malaysia
Brazilian expatriate sportspeople in Malaysia
Brazilian expatriate sportspeople in Indonesia
Rio Branco Football Club players
Selangor FA players
Bali United F.C. players
Liga 1 (Indonesia) players
Malaysia Super League players
Footballers from São Paulo